is a passenger railway station located in the city of Ayabe, Kyoto Prefecture, Japan, operated by West Japan Railway Company (JR West).

Lines

Station layout
The station consists of two opposed side platforms connected by a level crossing. There is no station building and the station is unattended.

Platforms

Adjacent stations

History
Takasu Station opened on February 12, 1958. With the privatization of the Japan National Railways (JNR) on April 1, 1987, the station came under the aegis of the West Japan Railway Company.

Passenger statistics
In fiscal 2016, the station was used by an average of 123 passengers daily.

Surrounding area
 Kyoto Kyoritsu Hospital

See also
List of railway stations in Japan

External links

 Station Official Site

Railway stations in Kyoto Prefecture
Sanin Main Line
Railway stations in Japan opened in 1958
Ayabe, Kyoto